Ľubeľa is a village and municipality in Liptovský Mikuláš District in the Žilina Region of northern Slovakia.

History 
In historical records the village was first mentioned in 1278.

Geography 
The municipality lies at an altitude of 612 metres and covers an area of 17.457 km². It has a population of about 1088 people.

See also
 Liubelia a Ukrainian village with phonetically same name

External links 
 http://www.statistics.sk/mosmis/eng/run.html

Villages and municipalities in Liptovský Mikuláš District